Cerro Ballena (lit. "Whale Hill") is a Chilean Late Miocene palaeontological site hosting remains of cetaceans. It is located in the Atacama Desert along the Pan-American Highway a few kilometers north of the port of Caldera. Besides cetaceans Cerro Ballena does also contains fossils of pinnipeds, sailfishes, aquatic sloths and marine invertebrate as well as trace fossils. It has about 40 cetacean individuals all of them in relatively good state. The cetaceans appear to have died at different times but due to the same causes: poisoning by toxins secreted by algae. The site was discovered in 2011 and is protected by law since 2012. It hosts an investigation centre. 

As of February 2014 scientists from Brazil, Chile and the United States were studying the site.

Geologically Cerro Ballena is part of the Cerro Ballena Member of Bahía Inglesa Formation.

See also
Coquimbo Formation
Evolution of cetaceans
Navidad Formation

References

Cetaceans
Paleontology in Chile
Miocene paleontological sites
Protected areas of Atacama Region
Cenozoic paleontological sites of South America